Dejan Dražić (born 26 September 1995) is a Serbian professional footballer who plays as a winger for Radnik Surdulica.

Club career

OFK Beograd
Born in Sombor, Dražić spent his formative years with Teleoptik Zemun and Partizan Belgrade. He subsequently went on trial at Russian club Rubin Kazan, before returning to Serbia and signing his first professional contract with OFK Beograd at the age of 18.

Dražić made his official debut for the club on 21 September 2013, coming on as a second-half substitute for Aleksandar Čavrić in a 0–2 away loss to his former side Partizan. He scored his first professional goal on 19 October, netting his team's first in a 2–3 home loss against Radnički Kragujevac.

On 9 November 2013, Dražić scored a brace in a 3–2 home win over Jagodina. He finished his first senior season with four league goals from 23 appearances.

Celta
On 7 August 2015, Dražić signed a five-year deal with Spanish La Liga side Celta de Vigo. He made his first appearance as a substitute, coming on for Theo Bongonda in a 1–1 draw against Eibar.

On 30 August 2016, Dražić was loaned to Real Valladolid in Segunda División, for one year.

International career
Dražić represented Serbia at the 2014 UEFA Under-19 Championship, making three appearances.

Honours
ŠK Slovan Bratislava
Fortuna Liga (1): 2018–19

References

External links

1995 births
Sportspeople from Sombor
Living people
Serbian footballers
Serbia youth international footballers
Serbia under-21 international footballers
Association football wingers
OFK Beograd players
RC Celta de Vigo players
Celta de Vigo B players
Real Valladolid players
ŠK Slovan Bratislava players
Zagłębie Lubin players
Budapest Honvéd FC players
FK Radnik Surdulica players
Serbian SuperLiga players
La Liga players
Segunda División players
Segunda División B players
Slovak Super Liga players
Ekstraklasa players
Nemzeti Bajnokság I players
TFF First League players
Serbian expatriate footballers
Serbian expatriate sportspeople in Spain
Serbian expatriate sportspeople in Slovakia
Serbian expatriate sportspeople in Poland
Serbian expatriate sportspeople in Hungary
Serbian expatriate sportspeople in Turkey
Expatriate footballers in Spain
Expatriate footballers in Slovakia
Expatriate footballers in Poland
Expatriate footballers in Hungary
Expatriate footballers in Turkey